José Antonio Zaldúa Urdanavia, known as Zaldúa, (15 December 1941 – 30 June 2018), was a Spanish footballer who played as a forward.

He was born in Elizondo, Navarre. Throughout his career, Zaldúa played for Spanish clubs Real Valladolid, FC Barcelona, CA Osasuna and CE Sabadell FC. At international level, he represented the Spain national football team.

External links
 
 National team data at BDFutbol
 
 FC Barcelona profile 
  Matches in European Cups at RSSSF

1941 births
2018 deaths
People from Baztán (comarca)
Spanish footballers
Footballers from Navarre
Association football forwards
La Liga players
Segunda División players
Real Valladolid players
FC Barcelona players
CA Osasuna players
CE Sabadell FC footballers
Spain youth international footballers
Spain B international footballers
Spain international footballers
Catalonia international guest footballers